List of champions of the 1888 U.S. National Championships (now known as the US Open). The men's tournament was held from 22 August to 30 August on the outdoor grass courts at the Newport Casino in Newport, Rhode Island. The women's tournament was held from 12 June to 15 June on the outdoor grass courts at the Philadelphia Cricket Club in Philadelphia, Pennsylvania. The men's doubles event was played at the Staten Island Cricket Club in Livingston, Staten Island, New York. It was the 8th U.S. National Championships and the second Grand Slam tournament of the year.:

Champions

Men's singles

 Henry Slocum defeated  Howard Taylor 6–4, 6–1, 6–0

Women's singles

 Bertha Townsend defeated  Ellen Hansell 6–3, 6–5

Men's doubles

 Oliver Campbell /  Valentine Hall defeated  Clarence Hobart /  Edward MacMullen 6–4, 6–2, 6–2

References

External links
Official US Open website

 
U.S. National Championships
U.S. National Championships (tennis) by year
U.S. National Championships (tennis)
U.S. National Championships (tennis)
U.S. National Championships (tennis)
U.S. National Championships (tennis)